Algeria competed at the 1980 Summer Olympics in Moscow, USSR.  The nation returned to the Olympic Games after boycotting the 1976 Summer Olympics. 54 competitors, all men, took part in 28 events in 9 sports.

Athletics

Men
Track & road events

Field events

Boxing

Men's Light Flyweight (– 48 kg)
 Ahmed Siad
 First round — Bye
 Second round — Defeated Lincoln Salcedo (Ecuador) on points (5-0)
 Quarter Finals — Lost to Ismail Mustafov (Bulgaria) on points (0-5)

Men's Light-Welterweight (– 63,5 kg)
 Boualem Bel Alouane
 First round — Defeated Barrington Cambridge (Guyana) on points (5-0)
 Second round — Lost to Ace Rusevski (Yugoslavia) on points (0-5)

Light Heavyweight (– 81 kg)
 Mohamed Bouchiche
 First round — Lost to Pawel Skrzecz (Poland) after walkover

Fencing

One fencer represented Algeria in 1980.

Men's foil
 Tahar Hamou

Football

Team Squad
Head coach: Mahieddine Khalef

Group results

Group standings
Group C

Quarter-final

Handball

Men's Team Competition
 Preliminary Round (Group B)
 Lost to Yugoslavia (18-22)
 Lost to Romania (18-26)
 Lost to Soviet Union (10-33)
 Lost to Switzerland (18-26)
 Defeated Kuwait (30-17)
 Classification Match
 9th/10th place: Lost to Denmark (20-29) → 10th place

Team Roster
 Ahmed Farfar
 Abdelkerim Hamiche
 Azeddine Bouzerar
 Omar Azeb
 Ali Akacha
 Ahcene Djeffal
 Kamel Hebri
 Mouloud Meknache
 Abdelmadjid Slimani
 Abdelkrim Bendjemil
 Abdelatif Bergheul
 Abdelatif Bakir
 Rachid Mokrani
 Mohamed Machou

Judo

Men

Swimming

Men

Weightlifting

Bantamweight (56 kg)
Ahmed Tarbi →   Total: 240.0 kg  → 11th place

Featherweight (60 kg)
Mohamed Gouni →   Total: 247.5 kg  → 11th place

Heavyweight I (100 kg)
Omar Yousfi →   Total: 320.0 kg  → 13th place

Wrestling

Men's freestyle

Men's Greco-Roman

References

External links
 Official Olympic Reports

Nations at the 1980 Summer Olympics
1980
Olympics